The Cady Mountains are a mountain range in the Mojave Desert and within Mojave Trails National Monument, in San Bernardino County, California.

They are located between Interstate 15 and Interstate 40, just east of Newberry Springs.

The Pisgah Crater is found south of the Cady Mountains, on the south side of Interstate 40.

References

Additional sources 

Mountain ranges of the Mojave Desert
Mountain ranges of San Bernardino County, California
Mojave Trails National Monument
Mountain ranges of Southern California